The men's 3000 metres steeplechase event at the 1973 Summer Universiade was held at the Central Lenin Stadium in Moscow on 17 and 19 August.

Medalists

Results

Heats

Final

References

Athletics at the 1973 Summer Universiade
1973